Great Western Railway (GWR) is a British train operating company owned by FirstGroup that operates the Greater Western passenger railway franchise. It manages 197 stations and its trains call at over 270. GWR operates long-distance inter-city services along the Great Western Main Line to and from the West of England and South Wales, inter-city services from London to the West Country via the Reading–Taunton line, and the Night Riviera sleeper service between London and Penzance. It also provides commuter and outer-suburban services from its London terminus at Paddington to West London, the Thames Valley region including parts of Berkshire, parts of Buckinghamshire and Oxfordshire; and regional services throughout the West of England and South Wales to the South coast of England. Great Western Railway also provides and maintains the Electrostar Class 387 fleet for Heathrow Express.

The company began operating in February 1996 as Great Western Trains, as part of the privatisation of British Rail. In December 1998, it became First Great Western after FirstGroup bought out its partners' shares in Great Western Holdings. In April 2006, First Great Western, First Great Western Link and Wessex Trains were combined into the new Greater Western franchise and brought under the First Great Western brand. The company adopted its current name and a new livery in September 2015 to coincide with the start of a contract that is due to run until June 2028.

History

As part of the privatisation of British Rail, the Great Western InterCity franchise was awarded by the Director of Passenger Rail Franchising to Great Western Holdings in December 1995, and it began operations on 4 February 1996. Great Western Holdings was owned by some former British Rail managers (51%), FirstBus (24.5%) and 3i (24.5%).

In March 1998, FirstGroup bought out its partners' stakes to give it 100% ownership. In December 1998, the franchise was rebranded First Great Western.

On 1 April 2004, First Great Western Link began operating the Thames Trains franchise.

On 1 April 2006, the Great Western, Great Western Link and Wessex Trains franchises were combined into a new Greater Western franchise. FirstGroup, National Express and Stagecoach were shortlisted to bid for it. On 13 December 2005, it was announced that FirstGroup had won the franchise. Originally, First planned to subdivide its services into three categories based on routes. Following feedback from staff and stakeholders, the decision was taken to re-brand and re-livery all services as 'First Great Western'.

In May 2011, FirstGroup announced that it had decided not to take up the option to extend its franchise beyond the end of March 2013. It stated that, in the light of the £1billion plan to electrify the Great Western route from London via Bristol to Cardiff, it wished to try to negotiate a longer-term deal. CEO Tim O'Toole said: "We believe we are best placed to manage these projects and capture the benefits through a longer-term franchise."

By not taking up the option to extend its original franchise contract for a further three years, FirstGroup avoided having to pay £826.6million to the government; it received extra subsidies totalling £133million from the government in 2010.

In March 2012, Arriva, FirstGroup, National Express and Stagecoach were shortlisted to bid for the new franchise. The winner was expected to be announced in December 2012, with the new franchisee taking over in April 2013. But it was announced in July 2012 that the franchise would be extended, due to the late issue of the invitation to tender (ITT). The ITT ran from the end of July until October 2012. The winner would have been announced in March 2013, and taken on the franchise from 21 July 2013 until the end of July 2028. The new franchise would include the introduction of new Intercity Express Trains, capacity enhancements and smart ticketing. The award of the franchise was again delayed in October 2012, while the Department for Transport (DfT) reviewed the way rail franchises were awarded.

In January 2013, the government announced that the current competition for the franchise had been aborted, and that FirstGroup's contract had been extended until October 2013. A two-year franchise extension until September 2015 was agreed in October 2013, and subsequently extended until March 2019. A further extension to April 2019 was granted in March 2015.

The refurbishment of first-class carriages in 2014 included interiors that featured a new GWR logo, with no First branding. The whole company was rebranded Great Western Railway (GWR) on 20 September 2015, with the introduction of a green livery in recognition of the former Great Western Railway which existed between 1835 and 1947. The new livery was introduced when HST interiors were refurbished, and on sleeper carriages and Class 57/6 locomotives.

In May 2018, TfL Rail took over services from Paddington to Hayes and Harlington, and in December 2019 it took over some stopping services to Reading.

In March 2020, a further extension to 31 March 2023 was awarded by the DfT with an option to extend for a further year.

In June 2022, the company's franchise was replaced by the DfT with a direct award contract that expires on 25 June 2028, with an option to extend for a further three years.

GWR is one of several train operators impacted by the 2022–2023 United Kingdom railway strikes, which are the first national rail strikes in the UK for three decades. Its workers are amongst those who are participating in industrial action due to a dispute over pay and working conditions.

Routes
Great Western Railway is the primary train operator in Devon, Cornwall, Somerset, Bristol, Berkshire, Wiltshire, Gloucestershire, and Oxfordshire.

The following is a simplified list of off-peak weekday service from the December 2022 timetables.

Intercity

Thames Valley

Bristol

West of England

Named trains

Great Western Railway's named passenger trains include:

Onboard services

Pullman Dining
Great Western Railway is now the only major UK rail operator with restaurant cars. These operate on certain West Country and Wales trains to or from London Paddington. They are available to first-class and standard-class passengers, though only first-class passengers may make advance reservations, and they have priority over seats in the restaurant. Meals in the restaurant car are not included in the price of rail tickets.

First class

GWR has first class on all its long-distance high-speed services. First class on the IETs includes fabric reclining seating with tables at every seat, as well as an at-seat service provided by a customer host on most journeys. Unlike the previous HSTs, the IETs do not have leather first-class seating due to fire regulations. Like the HSTs, there are power sockets and USB charging points at every seat. There is Wi-Fi throughout the first class-carriages, which GWR describes as 'upgraded'.

Standard class

Standard class is provided on all services. Many services on long-distance and regional routes have specific seat reservations.

Trolley service
An at-seat trolley service is scheduled to operate on most IET services, with a trolley in each portion of a ten-coach train. This is different from the HSTs, which had buffet counters branded as 'Express Cafes'.

Performance

Punctuality

In 2004–2005, 79.6% of trains arrived on time (defined as within 10 minutes of their scheduled arrival time). On 22 December 2006, the First Great Western InterCity service was declared the worst in Britain for delays, according to figures from the Office of Rail Regulation, with more than one in four trains running late.

First Great Western admitted to misreporting the number of cancellations in the period from August to December 2007, revised figures showing the company to have breached the cancellation threshold in the franchise contract. Specifically the company was alleged to have deliberately cancelled trains on the day prior to service without the prior approval of the DfT, and without recording these cancellations on their performance figures. The company was also accused of falsifying records in order to claim dispensation for large numbers of cancellations. First Great Western was named in a Passenger Focus survey as the worst train operating company for 2007.

On 6 September 2007, FirstGroup announced changes to its management structure, apparently designed to strengthen the First Great Western commuter services. Anthony Smith, head of the rail users council Passenger Focus commented, "A fresh management approach is welcome. Clearly, looking at the passenger satisfaction scores for First Great Western, the train company and Network Rail have a lot to do. However, passengers will believe it when they see improvements."

Some delays are attributable to Network Rail rather than the operator, as the Office of Rail Regulation (ORR) found in September 2007, when it remarked that the First Great Western service continued "to suffer from very high levels of delays attributed to Network Rail" and described Network Rail's performance as "exceptionally disappointing".

By 2009, passenger satisfaction with First Great Western was described by Passenger Focus as having "significantly improved".

The company is no longer the worst-performing UK rail operator, a title which it held for a long period. However, the Which? survey of rail passengers published in February 2013 showed the company scoring lowest of the larger operators with less than 40% satisfaction (Virgin, which topped the poll, managed 67%).

The latest punctuality statistics to be released by Network Rail for period 7 of 20132014 were 89.3% PPM (Public Performance Measure) and a MAA (Moving Annual Average) of 88.8% for the 12 months up to 12 October 2013.

Remedial plan

In February 2008 the Secretary of State for Transport stated that FGW had "fallen persistently short of customers' expectations and been unacceptable to both passengers and government", issuing them with a Breach Notice for misreporting cancellations and a Remedial Plan Notice as a result of exceptionally high levels of cancellations and low passenger satisfaction. As part of the Remedial Plan Notice, First Great Western was required to achieve improvement milestones, to lease five more Class 150 units to allow three-car trains to be used on Portsmouth-Cardiff services, to undertake a much more extensive refurbishment of the Thames Turbo fleet, to offer 50% higher compensation for the duration of the franchise, to offer 500,000 more cheap tickets on off-peak services, and to improve station customer information systems. Failure to do this would result in FGW losing its franchise. FirstGroup's railway operating profit, meanwhile, was reported to have risen 10% in the six months to September 2007.

By June 2009, FGW had transformed its performance to become one of the UK rail network's more punctual operators, recording 94.6% of trains arriving on time. In February 2010 FGW was named Train Operator of the Year at the national Rail Business awards. Presenting the award, judges said, "First Great Western provides an extensive network of commuter, regional, local and intercity trains. The systems they have put into place over the last two years have made a significant improvement to the service they now provide."

However, in February 2015 First Great Western came 17th (out of 21) in Which? magazine's Best and worst UK train companies survey. Customers gave First Great Western a score of 47% (compared to the worst-performing operator, Govia Thameslink Railway, with a score of 43%, and the best-performing operator, Grand Central, with a score of 76%). First Great Western also scored three out of five stars across five of six specific categories, apart from Value for money in which First Great Western scored two out of five stars.

Overcrowding

First Great Western has been criticised for overcrowded trains, and in January 2007 commuters on the Bath-Bristol service staged a protest against overcrowding. Participants were issued with imitation tickets printed with "Ticket type: standing only", "Class: cattle truck", "Route: hell and back", "Price: up 12%". The company threatened protestors with criminal prosecution and fines of £5,000, but staff failed to enforce ticket requirements. Alison Forster, First Great Western's Managing Director at that time, apologised to customers.

In January 2008, another fare strike was held as a passenger group said that not enough improvements had been made, despite First Great Western announcing that 2008 season tickets and car-parking charges would be frozen until the end of the year.

By December 2011, this had reduced to two.

In 2011, First Great Western was revealed to be the train company with the highest levels of overcrowding: an average of 16.6% of passengers were shown to be standing during the morning and evening peak times. In 2012, it held the record for the most overcrowded train, carrying nearly twice its capacity, the 07:44 Henley-on-Thames to London Paddington. Paddington, the London terminus for many FGW services, was identified as the most overcrowded station. The company was also listed as the operator with the most passengers in excess of capacity in the south east region in 2012.

Disabled passengers
In July 2018, a disabled woman was threatened by Great Western Railway staff with police action and removal from the train she was travelling in, for using a disabled space for her mobility scooter. Canadian-born comedian Tanyalee Davis, who has a form of dwarfism, said she was humiliated when a Great Western Railway conductor made an announcement that she was "causing problems" which had delayed the train. The incident occurred after a woman travelling with a young child demanded that Davis make way for her pram. GWR said the incident should not have happened and "No one travelling with us should be left feeling like this".

Strike action
In 2015, the imminent arrival of the new  trains provoked a series of strikes by the RMT union over who has the right to control the doors. First Great Western wanted to replace conductors with driver-only operation (DOO); however, following several discussions it was agreed to keep conductors on all IET services. 
Another strike took place in early December 2016 amidst a background of ongoing rail strikes on a national level. The RMT ballotted Servest UK workers employed on an outsourcing contract to GWR as cleaners; the ballot passed in favour of strike action by 98%. A disruptive transfer period in the outsourcing contract, from Mitie to Servest UK, had resulted in what the RMT referred to as the creation of a "two-tier workforce" amongst cleaners at GWR, with an inequality in pay and working conditions between cleaners employed directly by GWR and those outsourced to Servest UK. Two 24-hour strikes were held from 06:00 on 16 and 23 December, followed by a 48-hour strike from 06:00 on 19 January 2017. Further industrial action was suspended by the RMT following the January strike as a result of an improvement in ongoing negotiations between the RMT, GWR and Servest UK. The dispute was formally resolved in July 2017, as RMT members voted in favour of accepting a new pay deal.

The temporary withdrawal of IETs

Eight trains were withdrawn from service and an investigation started into the cause. On 8 May, all these trains and similar ones operated by other companies were taken out of service. Cracks had now been found in the lifting pads (a component fixed near the bogie) and it was feared that if these were to fall off they may cause injury or derailment.

The only IETs that were permitted to operate were those which had been carefully inspected and found to have no significant cracks. Plans were agreed on 13 May to increase inspections of the lifting pads and yaw dampers so that more trains could be returned to service. A further six Class 387s were loaned from Govia Thameslink Railway in July 2021 and used in a common pool with GWR's existing 387/1 fleet, being surplus to requirements while the Gatwick Express service was suspended.

Rolling stock
Great Western Railway inherited a fleet of InterCity 125 sets (Class 43 power cars and Mark 3 Coaches) and  locomotives and Mark 3 sleeper coaches from BR.

Inter-City services

Class 800 Intercity Express Train

Most Great Western Railway intercity services are operated by a fleet of 57 Class 800 trains from the Hitachi A-train family. On 28 April 2021, six Class 800s were withdrawn from service due to cracks being found during maintenance and were sent to Hitachi for inspection.

Class 802 Intercity Express Train

These trains are almost identical to the Class 800 trains, except they have a higher engine operating power— per engine as opposed to —and are fitted with larger fuel tanks to cope with the gradients and extended running in diesel mode on the long unelectrified stretches in Devon and Cornwall. Hitachi planned to test a tri-mode Class 802 in 2022 fitted with batteries in an attempt to reduce emissions entering and leaving stations.

Sleeper services

Class 57/6 + Mark 3

Four Class 57/6 locomotives haul Night Riviera Sleeper services, and failed HST sets. When these are unavailable, GWR hires Direct Rail Services Class 57/3 locomotives to operate the Night Riviera.

Thames Valley and Bristol services

Class 165/1 Networker Turbo

The  "Networker Turbo" is a two- or three-coach DMU used on shorter-distance services in the Thames Valley area, with the majority based at Reading Traction Maintenance Depot. They are mainly used on branches such as the Greenford branch line, Slough–Windsor & Eton line, Marlow branch line and Regatta Line. They are also used on services between Reading and Basingstoke, Didcot Parkway and Oxford or Banbury and sometimes services between London and Oxford. Some (eventually all) are based at St Philip's Marsh depot in Bristol, where they work on the most of the lines in the area including the Severn Beach line, Heart of Wessex Line, Golden Valley line and Bristol to Exeter line. From summer 2018, they are due to run on Cardiff Central to Portsmouth Harbour services too.
In response to its Remedial Plan Notice, First Great Western undertook a more thorough refurbishment of the Thames Turbo fleet than originally planned: the trains were to be fitted with improved lighting, carpets, toilets, and a revised seating layout. This refurbishment started in September 2016.

Class 166 Networker Turbo

The  "Networker Turbo" is a three-coach DMU, similar to the Class 165 units but with an internal layout more suitable for longer-distance services. They are now mostly based at St Philip's Marsh depot in Bristol, where they currently work on most of the lines in the area including the Wessex Main Line, Severn Beach line, Heart of Wessex Line, Golden Valley line and Bristol to Taunton line.

Class 387/1 Electrostar

The  "Electrostar" is a four-coach EMU built by Bombardier, with a 2+2 seating layout, tables, power sockets and free Wi-Fi. It can be operated in four, eight- and twelve-coach formations. The class began to enter service in September 2016 on weekday peak services between London Paddington and Hayes & Harlington, using the overhead electrical equipment used by Heathrow Express. Services using the class were extended to Maidenhead in May 2017 and later to Didcot Parkway, and from Reading to Newbury.

Bombardier Transportation at Ilford Depot had modified twelve of these trains by December 2020, installing new first-class seating, Wi-Fi, luggage racks and on-board entertainment, to be used on Heathrow Express services. Rebranded as "Heathrow Express", and refurbished with Heathrow Express moquette, they replaced the existing , entering service on 29 December 2020.

West of England services

Class 43 + Mark 3 HST / Class 255 Castle

Great Western Railway will be retaining 24 power cars and 48 carriages from its former High Speed Train fleet to form 12 'Castle' 2+4 sets. They are branded as Class 255 sets and will be for use on multiple services between Cardiff, Exeter and Penzance. All power cars being retained will have new nameplates, named after castles from across the area that GWR serve. The sets are progressively being fitted with automatic doors and controlled emission toilets, to allow their operation beyond 2020, at Doncaster Works. Due to a delay in refurbishing the Castle sets, slam door 2+4 sets known as 'Classic' sets were used until the end of 2019.

Until 2017, GWR operated the vast majority of its long-distance services with a fleet of 58 InterCity 125 High Speed Train sets, each consisting of eight Mark 3 coaches sandwiched between two Class 43 locomotives. GWR operated the largest InterCity 125 fleet, owning five sets outright; the rest were leased from Angel Trains and Porterbrook. From 2009 to 2012 (when Class 180s were reintroduced on the Cotswold line) all the company's intercity services were worked by HSTs except the Night Riviera sleeper service between London Paddington and Penzance. GWR continued to use HSTs on services to Exeter, Plymouth and Penzance until May 2019, when they were all withdrawn in favour of Class 802 units.

The youngest Class 43 locomotive dated from 1982. After a successful trial by Angel Trains and FGW in 2004, two power cars received new MTU engines while two received new Paxman VP185s, fitted by Brush Traction of Loughborough. The MTU engine proved the better option, both for reliability and for emissions, resulting in FGW, Brush and Angel Trains starting the HST Modernisation programme. The last power cars to be re-engineered were released in April 2008, while several other companies' HSTs have now all undergone a similar programme.

GWR's High Speed Train fleet were refurbished by Bombardier in Derby and Ilford between 2006 and 2008, with leather seats introduced in first class, redesigned toilets, a redesigned buffet, and at-seat power points. The company opted for mainly airline seats, giving more seats per train.

Following the Southall and Ladbroke Grove rail crashes, GWR requires its HSTs to have automatic train protection and Automatic Warning System safety systems in operation. If either is faulty, the train is not used.

Class 150/2 Sprinter

The fleet of 17 two-coach  Sprinter units was inherited from Wessex Trains as part of the Greater Western franchise shuffle. The fleet had been refurbished by Wessex Trains in 2003, with 2+2 seating arranged in a mixture of 'airline' (face to back) and table seating. The fleet is widespread throughout the former Wessex area, and carried a maroon livery with advertising vinyls for South West Tourism. Each unit was sponsored by a district, town or attraction and carried a unique livery. Most received names of attractions, places and branch lines. Two units were repainted into the new First 'Local' livery, but all units are now due to receive the new green GWR livery. As part of a national fleet shuffle, eight units went to Arriva Trains Wales on 10 December 2006, and were replaced with 8 Class 158 units.

First Great Western received five extra Class 150/2 units in May 2007 as part of its Remedial Plan Notice, to enable three-car Class 158 trains to operate on the Portsmouth-Cardiff services. Five Class 150 sets were hired from Arriva Trains Wales from March 2008 until they were returned in November 2010.

Class 158 Express Sprinter

The  is a two- or three-coach DMU used on regional express services in the former Wessex Trains area. In February 2008, as part of its Remedial Plan Notice, First Great Western announced that it would form some hybrid three-car Class 158 units in March 2008, made possible by the transfer of five Class 150/2 units from Arriva Trains Wales. There are now ten hybrid units in operation and, combined with the non-hybrid three-car unit, this provides eleven three-car units to operate services between Portsmouth and Cardiff, Great Malvern and Weymouth. After the introduction of Class 150/1 trains from London Overground and London Midland, three of the remaining five two-coach Class 158s will be reformed to provide two further three-coach Class 158s.

The fleet was refurbished in a programme begun in 2007, which included fitting of reupholstered seats, new lighting and floor coverings, CCTV within the passenger saloons, and refurbished toilets. At the same time, the exteriors of the vehicles were repainted in the updated FGW livery, including artwork depicting various local places of interest. GWR's Class 158 vehicles were refurbished at Wabtec in Doncaster.

In 2018, the 158s began running alongside the first completed Class 255 Castle set on services between Bristol, Exeter, Plymouth and Penzance. Since then, more of the 158 fleet has gradually started to move more west with more 158 sets working services between Exmouth and Paignton / Barnstaple. The timetable change in December 2019 saw the start of the 158s taking over the 143s on the Tarka Line to Barnstaple primarily, with some of the units also working on the Cardiff / Bristol to Penzance route alongside the Castle sets.

Current fleet

Future fleet
In 2022, GWR's parent company FirstGroup issued an expressions of interest notice to manufacturers to supply a new fleet of bi-mode locomotives for its subsidiary TransPennine Express, with an option for additional locomotives to replace GWR's  sleeper service locomotives.

On 31 May 2022, GWR announced they are looking for 30 four-coach 110 mph capable 25kV EMU trains for services between London Paddington and Swindon, capable of continuing to Cardiff.

In February 2023, GWR purchased a number of assets from the administrators of battery train manfuacturer Vivarail, including  rolling stock and intellectual propery rights. GWR have also employed nine Vivarail staff. It intends to trial the Class 230 units on the Greenford branch line between West Ealing and Greenford.

Past fleet
 
Former train types operated by Great Western Railway include:

Locomotive-hauled trains were in use on services between Cardiff, Bristol, Taunton and Paignton from December 2008 until November 2010 using Virgin Trains  locomotives with Mark 2 coaching stock. A second set hauled by EWS s was used between December 2009 and October 2010. These were withdrawn when sufficient DMUs were available following the transfer of six Class 150/1 sets from London Overground. First Great Western issued a tender in May 2013 so that locomotive-hauled trains, or other train formations, could be operated on the Taunton-Cardiff route again, proposed to start in December 2013, to cover for DMUs out of service for refurbishment on Monday-to-Friday diagrams. GWR also runs loco-hauled sets composed of seating coaches and a Class 57 locomotive from the Night Riviera service between Penzance and Exeter St Davids as part of the summer timetable to release a DMU for other services.

Twelve  Pacer DMUs were received by First Great Western in 2007, starting operations that December. These were sub-leased from Northern Rail (where they had been stored), in part to cover for refurbishment of FGW's Sprinter fleets but also to allow the Class 158s to be re-formed as three-coach sets. They were based at Exeter TMD, working alongside the similar  on services in Devon and Cornwall, including the Avocet Line, Riviera Line and Tarka Line. Five 142s were returned to Northern Rail in late 2008, following the completion of the refresh of Class 150 Sprinter units. The remaining seven units were returned to Northern Rail by November 2011 as they had been replaced by Class 150 units cascaded from London Overground and London Midland following the arrival of new  Turbostar units.

GWR's Night Riviera service also included the UK's last Motorail service, until that aspect was withdrawn at the end of the 2005 summer season due to low usage.

First Great Western previously leased 14  Adelante units, operating on the Great Western Main Line, but following technical issues they were transferred elsewhere. In 2012, five units were returned to First Great Western to operate weekday services on the Cotswold Line, allowing class 165 and 166 units to be reallocated to increase capacity on Thames Valley services. The Class 180s left GWR in stages between June and December 2017 to join Grand Central.

The 150/1s in the GWR fleet transferred to Arriva Rail North in stages, beginning with the first three in August 2017 when their leases expired, and ending in April 2018. The 153s also transferred elsewhere in stages too, with the first four units going to East Midlands Trains and the next five units going to Arriva Rail North. This left just five 153 units with GWR, which eventually transferred to Transport for Wales in April 2019.

Rejected fleet
It was planned for Great Western Railway to operate nineteen Class 769/9 units once they were fully rolled out. The operator intended to run the first services in spring 2019, but this was delayed by issues faced by Porterbrook in converting the units. However, the first vehicle has been delivered and all were expected to be delivered by the end of 2021.

To enable this, GWR's allocation of Class 769 units would have retained their dual-voltage capability in addition to being fitted with diesel power units. The units would also receive an internal refurbishment and be fitted with air cooling.

The first Class 769 to be delivered to GWR was unit 769943, which arrived at Reading TMD in August 2020. It was expected to enter service in early 2021. The Class 769 was expected to enter service with GWR between June and December 2021, but this was later delayed to 2022.

In December 2022, GWR announced that the introduction of the Class 769 fleet would be abandoned and the units handed back to Porterbrook in April 2023.

Livery

Great Western Trains adopted a livery of dark-green upper body and ivory lower body, with a stylised 'Merlin' bird logo. Following the rebranding as First Great Western, fader vinyls were added to the lower body, with a gold bar containing the stylised FirstGroup F logo and separate Great Western logotype. This livery was sometimes known as the 'fag packet' livery.

When the Class 180 Adelante units were delivered, they were painted in the intercity version of FirstGroup's corporate bus livery. This consisted of a purple-blue base, with pink and gold bars and large pink Fs on the carriage sides and white highlights along the roof and around the driver's cab. The doors were painted white to comply with the Disability Discrimination Act 1995. The HST fleet was repainted to match as they went through overhaul; however, the livery on the power cars was progressively altered to a plain blue base with pink and gold stripes, following problems with dirt build-up on the large white areas.

The new Greater Western franchise involved repainting the HST fleet into FirstGroup's 'Dynamic Lines' livery for intercity and commuter services in the former First Great Western and First Great Western Link areas. The livery was initially applied to the HST fleet as they went through refurbishment, although the Class 180 units did not receive the new livery due to the termination of their lease. The commuter units also received the new livery while receiving standard maintenance, as a refurbishment was not originally planned.
The rebranding of the company as Great Western Railway introduced a new GWR logo and a dark green livery with white stripes and grey doors in September 2015.

Depots
Great Western Railway trains are based at eight depots. Other depots at Landore (Swansea) and Old Oak Common (London) closed in 2018.

Past Depots

TV documentary
Channel 5 broadcast two television series looking into day-to-day challenges of the Great Western mainline, including events at Dawlish (as well as the sea wall destruction), Cheltenham race day and rugby at Cardiff. It was broadcast as The Railway: First Great Western and the last series aired in 2015. A similar series based on London Paddington started in September 2017 and covered events such as the reaction to the Manchester Arena and London Bridge attacks, and several days of severe disruption.

Future of the franchise
The franchise was due to end on 31 March 2020. In November 2017, the DfT announced its intention to negotiate a further extension for the franchise until April 2022 with an option to extend for a further two years.  A new contract was agreed on 30 March 2020, running for three years, extendable to four.

See also
Great Western Railway, a railway company that existed from 1833 to 1948

References

External links

|-

|-

FirstGroup railway companies
Great Western Main Line
Railway companies established in 1996
Train operating companies in the United Kingdom
1996 establishments in England